Erdene is a sum of Töv Province in Mongolia. Sum center former location was 47 47 35 N 107 53 00 E. The Janchivlin and Ar Janchivlin resorts on mineral springs are 20 km SW from sum center.

Districts of Töv Province